Anthonomus lecontei is a species of snout or bark beetle in the family Curculionidae. It is found in North America.

References

Further reading

 
 
 
 

Curculioninae
Beetles described in 1975